Vynnychenko, also transliterated Vinnichenko, is a Ukrainian surname. Notable people with the surname include:

 Eleonora Vinnichenko, Ukrainian figure skater
 Mykola Vynnychenko (born 1958), Soviet-Ukrainian race walker
 Nikolay Vinnichenko (born 1965), Russian politician
 Rozalia Vynnychenko (1886–1959), wife of Volodymyr
 Valentin Vinnichenko (born 1995), Russian footballer
 Volodymyr Vynnychenko (1880–1951), Ukrainian writer and first Prime Minister of Ukraine

See also
 Vinichenko
 
 

Ukrainian-language surnames